Urceoliporidae is a family of bryozoans belonging to the order Cheilostomatida.

Genera:
 Cureolipora Gordon, 2000
 Reciprocus Gordon, 1988
 Urceolipora MacGillivray, 1881

References

Cheilostomatida
Bryozoan families